The Norwegian Athletics Association (NFIF) is the national governing body for the sport of athletics in Norway, including track and field, road running, cross country running and racewalking. The association is a member of the Norwegian Olympic and Paralympic Committee and Confederation of Sports, and a member of the International Association of Athletics Federations and European Athletics.

References

External links
 NFI web site

Norway
Athletics
1896 establishments in Norway
Organisations based in Oslo
Athletics in Norway
Orienteering in Norway
National governing bodies for athletics
Sports organizations established in 1896